Shandon Castle may refer to:
 Shandon Castle, Cork, Ireland
 Shandon Castle, Argyll and Bute, Scotland